Denise Gough (born 28 February 1980) is an Irish actress. She has received a number of accolades for her work in theatre, including two Laurence Olivier Awards as well as a nomination for a Tony Award.

Early life 
Born in Wexford and grew up in Ennis, Co. Clare, daughter of an electrician, Gough is the seventh of eleven siblings. One of her younger sisters is the actress Kelly Gough. She trained as a soprano before leaving Ireland for London at 15. She was awarded a grant to study at the Academy of Live and Recorded Arts (ALRA) in Wandsworth aged 18, and graduated from ALRA in 2003.

Theatre 
In 2012, she was nominated for the Milton Shulman Award for Outstanding Newcomer at the Evening Standard Theatre Awards for her performances in Eugene O'Neill's Desire Under the Elms at the Lyric Hammersmith and Nancy Harris Our New Girl at the Bush Theatre. In January 2014 she was Julia in The Duchess of Malfi, the inaugural production at the Sam Wanamaker Playhouse, London. At the National Theatre, London, in September 2015 she presented an "electrifying" performance as a recovering substance user in Duncan Macmillan's People, Places and Things,  directed by Jeremy Herrin. She reprised the role when the production transferred to the Wyndham's Theatre in March 2016, and subsequently won the Olivier Award for Best Actress. She returned to the National Theatre in April 2017 playing the role of Harper in Marianne Elliot's revival of Tony Kushner's play Angels in America, for which she won the 2018 Olivier Award for Best Actress in a Supporting Role. Gough then returned to People, Places & Things for its New York transfer. In February 2018, Gough returned to the role of Harper in the Broadway transfer of the National Theatre's production of Angels in America, alongside the majority of the London cast.

Stage roles

Filmography

Film

Television

Video games

Awards and nominations

References

External links

1980 births
Living people
20th-century Irish actresses
21st-century Irish actresses
Alumni of the Academy of Live and Recorded Arts
Irish film actresses
Irish stage actresses
Irish television actresses
Irish video game actresses
Irish voice actresses
Laurence Olivier Award winners
People from Ennis
Theatre World Award winners